Ifuru Airport is a domestic airport located in the Ungoofaaru area in Maldives. It is an operational public airport.

Specifications 
Ifuru Airport is at an elevation of 6 ft (2m) from the mean sea level. It has one runway with length 1200m and direction 18/36. The runway has an asphalt surface. 

The airport caters small island-hopping flights.

References 

Airports in the Maldives